David "Shoeless Joe"Barefoot is a paralympic athlete from Canada competing mainly in category C1 events.

David competed in the 1984 Summer Paralympics in archery, athletics and boccia. In Archery he won the gold in Men's Double FITA Round C1.

References

Paralympic archers of Canada
Paralympic track and field athletes of Canada
Paralympic boccia players of Canada
Archers at the 1984 Summer Paralympics
Athletes (track and field) at the 1984 Summer Paralympics
Boccia players at the 1984 Summer Paralympics
Paralympic gold medalists for Canada
Living people
Place of birth missing (living people)
Year of birth missing (living people)
Canadian male archers
Medalists at the 1984 Summer Paralympics
Paralympic medalists in archery